The Houston Ship Channel, in Houston, Texas, is part of the Port of Houston, one of the busiest seaports in the world. The channel is the conduit for ocean-going vessels between Houston-area terminals and the Gulf of Mexico, and it serves an increasing volume of inland barge traffic.

Overview
 
The channel is a widened and deepened natural watercourse created by dredging  Buffalo Bayou and Galveston Bay. The channel's upstream terminus lies about four miles east of downtown Houston, at the Turning Basin, with its downstream terminus at a gateway to the Gulf of Mexico, between Galveston Island and the Bolivar Peninsula. Major products, such as petrochemicals and Midwestern grain, are transported in bulk together with general cargo. The original watercourse for the channel, Buffalo Bayou, has its headwaters  to the west of the city of Houston. The navigational head of the channel, the most upstream point to which general cargo ships can travel, is at Turning Basin in east Houston.

The channel has numerous terminals and berthing locations along Buffalo Bayou and Galveston Bay. The major public terminals include Turning Basin, Barbours Cut, and Bayport. Many private docks are there as well, including the ExxonMobil Baytown Complex and the Deer Park Complex.

The islands in the ship channel are part of the ongoing widening and deepening project. The islands are formed from soil pulled up by dredging, and the salt marshes and bird islands are part of the Houston Port Authority's beneficial use and environmental mitigation responsibilities.

The channel has five vehicle crossings: Washburn Tunnel,  Sidney Sherman Bridge,  Sam Houston Ship Channel Bridge, popularly known as the Beltway 8 Bridge. Two Dollar bridge is another local nickname;  Fred Hartman Bridge connecting La Porte and Baytown, Texas; and Lynchburg Ferry.

History
 
John Richardson Harris platted the town of Harrisburg, Texas on Buffalo Bayou at the mouth of Brays Bayou in 1826. He established a steam mill there, while making Harrisburg into a logistical center for the Austin's Colony. He plied his schooner The Rights of Man through the waters of Galveston Bay and Buffalo Bayou, importing supplies from the United States, and exporting cotton and hides. However, fewer people settled Buffalo Bayou than the fertile Brazos Valley, so Harrisburg remained a remote overland location from the critical mass of farmlands: about 20 miles from Fort Bend, Texas and about 40 miles from San Felipe de Austin, Texas. Travelling the Brazos River presented several hazards, most of all, its shifting, shallow sandbars at its mouth. Despite several interventions, the river remained hostile to navigation. Nicholas Clopper acquired land downstream from Harrisburg, the eponymously named Clopper's Point. He recruited six men from Ohio to work as traders, who sailed the schooner Little Zoe from Cincinnati laden with supplies such as flour and spices, nails and other hardware, and whiskey and tobacco. Two of these hires were his sons, Edward and Joseph Clopper. They recorded their travels in a journal, reporting several hazards of Galveston Bay in route to Buffalo Bayou. They ran Little Zoe aground on Galveston Island and later observed two wrecked ships in the bay. They encountered the shallow Red Fish Bar, which they passed while dragging over it.

The channel has been used to move goods to the sea since at least 1836. Buffalo Bayou and Galveston Bay were dredged during the late 19th and early 20th centuries to accommodate larger ships. In the wake of the 1900 Galveston hurricane, the inland Port of Houston was seen as a safer long-term option, and planning for a larger ship channel began. By the mid 1900s the Port of Houston had established itself as the leading port in Texas, eclipsing the natural harbors at Galveston and Texas City. The Turning Basin terminal in Harrisburg (now part of Houston) became the port's largest shipping point.

On January 10, 1910, residents of Harris County voted 16 to 1 to fund dredging the Houston ship channel to a depth of 25 feet for the amount of $1,250,000, which was then matched by federal funds. On June 14, 1914 the first deepwater ship, steamship Satilla, arrived at the port of Houston, establishing steamboat service between New York City and Houston.
On November 10, 1914, President Woodrow Wilson opened the Houston Ship Channel, part of the Port of Houston. The onset of World War I and the first mechanized war's thirst for oil greatly increased use of the ship channel.

The United States Army Corps of Engineers increased the depth of the channel from 25 to 30 feet in 1922.

In 1933, the United States Department of War and the United States House Committee on Rivers and Harbors approved a plan to increase the depth of the channel from 30 to 34 feet and widen the Galveston Bay section from 250 to 400 feet. The Public Works Administration provided $2,800,000 dollars for the project, which was completed in late 1935.

The proximity to Texas oilfields led to the establishment of numerous petrochemical refineries along the waterway, such as the ExxonMobil Baytown installation on the eastern bank of the San Jacinto River. Now the channel and surrounding area support the second-largest petrochemical complex in the world.

While much of the Houston Ship Channel is associated with heavy industry, two icons of Texas history are also located along its length. The  saw service during both world wars, and is the oldest remaining example of a dreadnought-era battleship in existence. The nearby San Jacinto Monument commemorates the Battle of San Jacinto (1836) in which Texas won its independence from Mexico.

The US Army's San Jacinto Ordnance Depot was located on the channel from 1941–1964.

During World War II, two large shipyards produced side-by-side at the confluence of Greens Bayou: Todd Houston Shipbuilding built mostly Liberty Ships and Brown Shipbuilding built a substantial number of destroyer escorts, submarine chasers and amphibious landing craft.

Currently, the channel is dredged to a depth of 43–45 feet. The channel was designated a National Civil Engineering Landmark by the American Society of Civil Engineers (ASCE) in 1987.

The "Texas chicken" maneuver  is known to mariners who regularly navigate large vessels on the Houston Ship Channel. As two vessels approach from opposite directions, both normally turn to starboard to allow water displaced by their bows to move the ships away from each other and from the channel's centerline. After they pass, the suction of the displaced water flowing in behind the ships naturally pulls them back toward the center of the waterway.

Pollution

On December 25, 2007, the Houston Ship Channel was featured on the CNN Special, Planet in Peril, as a potential polluter of nearby neighborhoods. That year, the University of Texas released a study suggesting that children living within  of the Houston Ship Channel were 56% more likely to become sick with leukemia than the national average.

On March 22, 2014, a barge carrying nearly a million gallons of marine fuel oil collided with another ship in the Houston Ship Channel, causing the contents of one of the barge's 168,000-gallon tanks to leak into Galveston Bay.

Gallery

See also

Phillips disaster of 1989
I-610 Ship Channel Bridge

References

External links

 
 Time-lapse video of a barge navigating a length of the Houston Ship Channel at night
 See historical photographs of the Houston Ship Channel, the Houston community, and more at the University of Houston Digital Library

Ship canals
Canals in Texas
Greater Houston
Galveston Bay Area
Geography of Houston
Transportation in Chambers County, Texas
Transportation in Galveston County, Texas
Historic Civil Engineering Landmarks
Buildings and structures in Chambers County, Texas
Buildings and structures in Galveston County, Texas
Transportation buildings and structures in Harris County, Texas
Canals opened in 1914
1914 establishments in Texas